In economics the generalized-Ozaki cost is a general description of cost described by Shuichi Nakamura.

For output y, at date t and a vector of m input prices p, the generalized-Ozaki cost, c, is

Discussion

In econometrics it is often desirable to have a model of the cost of production of a given output with given inputs—or in common terms, what it will cost to produce some number of goods at prevailing prices, or given prevailing prices and a budget, how much can be made.  Generally there are two parts to a cost function, the fixed and variable costs involved in production.

The marginal cost is the change in the cost of production for a single unit. Most cost functions then take the price of the inputs and adjust for different factors of production, typically, technology, economies of scale, and elasticities of inputs.

Traditional cost functions include Cobb–Douglas and the constant elasticity of substitution models. These are still used because for a wide variety of activities, effects such as varying ability to substitute materials does not change. For example, for people running a bake sale, the ability to substitute one kind of chocolate chip for another will not vary over the number of cookies they can bake. However, as economies of scale and changes in substitution become important models that handle these effects become more useful, such as the transcendental log cost function.

The traditional forms are economically homothetic. This means they can be expressed as a function, and that function can be broken into an outer part and an inner part. The inner part will appear once as a term in the outer part, and the inner part will be monotonically increasing, or to say it another way, it never goes down. However, empirically in the areas of trade and production, homoethetic and monolithic functional models do not accurately predict results. One example is in the gravity equation for trade, or how much will two countries trade with each other based on GDP and distance. This led researchers to explore non-homothetic models of production, to fit with a cross section analysis of producer behavior, for example, when producers would begin to minimize costs by switching inputs, or investing in increased production.

References

Functions and mappings
Production economics